Great American Race may refer to:
Indianapolis 500, an open-wheel race
Daytona 500, a stock car race
Great Race (classic rally), an annual club rally for antique vehicles